Coordinates

Karakulino is a rural locality (a selo) and the administrative center of Karakulinsky District in the Udmurt Republic, Russia. Population:

References

Notes

Sources

Rural localities in Udmurtia